Moa Lignell (born 6 June 1994 in Alingsås, Sweden) is a Swedish singer, who came in third place in Idol 2011. Lignell released her first music single "When I Held Ya" during her time on Idol. She had sung the song during the Idol competition in 2011. Lignell has since her participation in the contest released two studio albums, Different Path and Ladie's man. She has also released the singles "Whatever They Do", "Born to Be" and "If Someone", the latter being released in 2020 and marks the latest release from Lignell.

Discography

Albums

Singles

References

External links

Facebook

Idol (Swedish TV series) participants
1994 births
Living people
21st-century Swedish singers